Little Kix is the third album by English alternative rock band Mansun, released on 14 August 2000 and was the band's last studio album to be completed and released before their dissolution in 2003.

Overview

The album was recorded aboard the Astoria, a boat that housed a recording studio owned by David Gilmour of Pink Floyd, and marked a departure from the band's previous way recording in that bandleader Draper had been removed from his position of producer by the record company and was replaced by Hugh Padgham, formerly a producer for Phil Collins, XTC and The Police, to ensure more "independent local radio friendly" sound. Draper also stated that the working method was greatly different from his work on the former two albums: "Little Kix was the only album I had to make demos for, the rest I just made up as I went along".

Record label interference extended further than the choice of producer, with Parlophone imposing several limitations that Draper felt restricted their creativity: "[W]e were battered into being a pop group with 'Little Kix'... We were told absolutely definitively 'You are not allowed to have any prog rock elements in the album', so that's why the album fades in and it's one second longer than Dark Side of the Moon, just to piss the record company off (laughs)". In the liner notes of Legacy: The Best of Mansun Draper provided an example of the dysfunction that existed between the band and its label that centred on the track "Fool". After reading a book on song writing by Jimmy Webb he claimed it "inspired me to write an ironic song that is now my least favourite Mansun track. Bowie intro, comical chorus lyrics and guess what? The label wanted it as a fucking single! I couldn’t believe it". 

Draper credits the album's gestation process as part of what ultimately led to the end of the band: "What's left is an odd story, people have spoken to me about writing books about it, I don't think I'll ever go on the record and tell the true story, there are one or two people that know. At the end of the day people always say bands split over musical differences but they never do. It's all to do with money and drugs and all sorts of shit."

Release

Little Kix was released in August 2000. Early album titles include Magnetic Poetry and The Trouble with Relationships. Little Kix did not match the popularity of the group's previous albums and reflected a continuing decline in commercial fortunes for the group. It peaked at #12 on the UK Albums Chart and was certified Silver by the BPI.

Three singles were released from the album. The first, "I Can Only Disappoint U" became one of the group's most successful singles peaking at #8 on the UK Singles Chart in the run up to the album's release.  "Electric Man", the second single was released in November and peaked at #23. The final single "Fool" charted at #28.

Track listing

Personnel

B-sides

Charts

References

External links

Little Kix at YouTube (streamed copy where licensed)

2000 albums
Mansun albums
Albums produced by Hugh Padgham
Parlophone albums